Tony McCombs (born August 24, 1974) is a former American football linebacker. He played for the Arizona Cardinals from 1997 to 1998.

References

1974 births
Living people
American football linebackers
Eastern Kentucky Colonels football players
Arizona Cardinals players